Theme in Seven is a Canadian music history television series which aired on CBC Television in 1955.

Premise
Jean de Rimanoczy, a violinist from Vancouver, hosted this series on the history of classical music and its related instruments. Subjects included chamber music, the effects of jazz on contemporary music and the romantic music period.

Scheduling
This half-hour series was broadcast Mondays at 9:30 p.m. from 8 August to 12 September 1955, with a finale episode on 18 September 1955 at 6:45 p.m.

References

External links
 

CBC Television original programming
1955 Canadian television series debuts
1955 Canadian television series endings
1950s Canadian music television series
Black-and-white Canadian television shows